Henry Cairns (11 December 1842 – 16 December 1888) was a New Zealand cricketer. He played four first-class matches for Otago between 1864 and 1870.

Cairns was born at Falkirk in Scotland in 1842. He worked as a salesman. His younger brother, Alexander Cairns, was also born in Scotland but educated at Otago Boys' High School in Dunedin. Cairns died in 1888 at Dunedin asylum.

References

External links
 

1842 births
1888 deaths
New Zealand cricketers
Otago cricketers
Sportspeople from Falkirk